The 24th AVN Awards ceremony, presented by Adult Video News (AVN), honored the best pornographic films of 2006 and took place January 13, 2007 at the Mandalay Bay Events Center in Paradise, Nevada. During the ceremony, Adult Video News presented AVN Awards (commonly referred to as the Oscars of porn) in 119 categories released during the eligibility period, Oct. 1, 2005 to Sept. 30, 2006. The ceremony, televised in the United States by Playboy TV, was produced and directed by Gary Miller. Adult film star Jessica Drake hosted for the  first time, with comedian Jim Norton, who also co-hosted in 2004.

Manhunters won seven awards, including Best Film and Best Director for Brad Armstrong, as did Corruption, which won Best Video Feature and Best Director—Video for Eli Cross. Other winners included Fuck and Sacred Sin each with five and Fashionistas Safado: The Challenge with three.

Winners and nominees

The nominees were announced Nov. 22, 2006 by AVN.

The winners were announced during the awards ceremony on January 13, 2007. The coveted Female Performer of the Year and Best New Starlet awards went to Hillary Scott and Naomi respectively while Tommy Gunn won Male Performer of the Year.

Major awards

Winners are listed first, highlighted in boldface, and indicated with a double dagger.

Additional Award Winners 
These awards were announced in a pre-recorded winners-only segment during the event but were not part of the televised awards show. Trophies were mailed to the recipients later:

DIRECTOR AWARDS
 Best Director - Film: Brad Armstrong, Manhunters
 Best Director - Foreign Release: Pierre Woodman, Sex City
 Best Director - Non-Feature: JacktheZipper, Blacklight Beauty
 Director of the Year (Body of Work): Jim Powers

MARKETING AWARDS
 Best New Video Production Company: Jules Jordan Video
 Best Online Marketing Campaign – Company: Digital Playground, DigitalPlayground.com
 Best Online Marketing Campaign – Individual Project: Sacred Sin, Ninn Worx
 Best Overall Marketing Campaign – Company Image: ClubJenna
 Best Overall Marketing Campaign – Individual Project: Sacred Sin, NinnWorx
 Best Packaging: Tailgunners, Adam & Eve
 Best Renting Title of the Year: Pirates
 Best Retail Website – Rentals: WantedList.com
 Best Retail Website – Sales: AdultDVDEmpire.com
 Best Selling Title of the Year: Pirates

PERFORMER AWARDS
 Best Male Newcomer: Tommy Pistol
 Best Non-Sex Performance: Bryn Pryor, Corruption
 Best Supporting Actor – Film: Kurt Lockwood, To Die For
 Best Supporting Actor – Video: Manuel Ferrara, She Bangs
 Best Supporting Actress – Film: Kirsten Price, Manhunters
 Contract Star of the Year: Stormy Daniels
 Crossover Star of the Year: Jenna Jameson
 Female Foreign Performer of the Year: Katsumi
 Male Foreign Performer of the Year: Jean Val Jean
 Transsexual Performer of the Year: Buck Angel
 Underrated Starlet of the Year (Unrecognized Excellence): Mika Tan

PRODUCTION AWARDS
 Best All-Girl Release: Belladonna: No Warning
 Best All-Girl Series: Erocktavision
 Best Alternative Release: Real Adventures 84
 Best Amateur Release: Bang Bus 9
 Best Amateur Series: Homegrown Video
 Best Anal-Themed Release: Weapons of Ass Destruction 4
 Best Anal-Themed Series: Big Wet Asses
 Best Animated Release: Pornomation 2
 Best Classic DVD: Neon Nights
 Best Continuing Video Series: Dementia
 Best Ethnic-Themed Release – Asian: Asia Noir 5: A Lust Supreme
 Best Ethnic-Themed Release – Black: Tales from the Darkside
 Best Ethnic-Themed Release – Latin: Brazilian Island 2
 Best Ethnic-Themed Series – Asian: Sakura Tales
 Best Ethnic-Themed Series – Black: Phatty Girls
 Best Foreign All-Sex Release: Euro Domination
 Best Foreign All-Sex Series: Obsession
 Best Foreign Feature: Porn Wars: Episode 1
 Best Gonzo Series: College Invasion
 Best Hard-Edged All-Sex Release: Slave Dolls 2
 Best High-Definition Production: Fashionistas Safado: The Challenge
 Best Interactive DVD: Virtual Vivid Girl Sunny Leone
 Best Interracial Release: Racial Tension
 Best Interracial Series: My Hot Wife Is Fucking Blackzilla
 Best Mainstream Adult Release: Pornography: The Secret History of Civilization
 Best Oral-Themed Release: Feeding Frenzy 8
 Best Oral-Themed Series: Hand To Mouth

Production (ctd.)
 Best POV Release: Pole Position: Lex POV 5
 Best POV Series: Jack's POV
 Best Pro-Am Release: Breakin' 'Em In 9
 Best Pro-Am Series: Beaver Hunt
 Best Sex Comedy: Joanna’s Angels 2: Alt Throttle
 Best Vignette Release: Jenna Haze Dark Side
 Best Vignette Series: Jack's Playground

SEX SCENE AWARDS
 Best All-Girl Sex Scene – Film: Jessica Drake, Katsumi, Felecia, Clara G.; Fuck
 Best Anal Sex Scene – Film: Jada Fire, Sandra Romain, Brian Surewood; Manhunters
 Best Group Sex Scene – Film: Carmen Hart, Katsumi, Kirsten Price, Mia Smiles, Eric Masterson, Chris Cannon, Tommy Gunn, Randy Spears; Fuck
 Best Group Sex Scene – Video: Belladonna, Melissa Lauren, Jenna Haze, Gianna Michaels, Sandra Romain, Adrianna Nicole, Flower Tucci, Sasha Grey, Nicole Sheridan, Marie Luv, Caroline Pierce, Lea Baren, Jewell Marceau, Jean Val Jean, Christian XXX, Voodoo, Chris Charming, Erik Everhard, Mr. Pete, Rocco Siffredi; Fashionistas Safado: The Challenge
 Best Oral Sex Scene – Film: Ice LaFox, Eric Masterson, Tommy Gunn, Marcus London, Mario Rossi; Fuck
 Best POV Sex Scene: Naomi, Tommy Gunn; Jack’s POV 2
 Best Sex Scene in a Foreign-Shot Production: Isabel Ice, Sandra Romain, Dora Venter, Cathy, Karina, Nicol, Puma Black, Erik Everhard, Steve Holmes, Robert Rosenberg; Outnumbered 4
 Best Solo Sex Scene: Alana Evans, Corruption
 Best Threeway Sex Scene: Sandra Romain, Sasha Grey, Manuel Ferrara; Fuck Slaves
 Most Outrageous Sex Scene: Ashley Blue, Amber Wild, Steve French in “Meat Is Murder”, Girlvert 11

SPECIALTY AWARDS
 Best Solo Release: I Love Big Toys 2
 Best Specialty Release – Big Bust: Breast Worship
 Best Specialty Release – BDSM: My New Girlfriend
 Best Specialty Release – Fem-Dom Strap-On: Strap Attack 4
 Best Specialty Release – Foot Fetish: Barefoot Confidential 40
 Best Specialty Release – MILF: Cheating Housewives 3
 Best Specialty Release – Other Genre: Horny Hairy Girls 22
 Best Specialty Release – Spanking: Baltimore Brat
 Best Specialty Release – Squirting: Flower's Squirt Shower 3
 Best Transsexual Release: Rogue Adventures 27
 Best Specialty Series – Big Bust: Boob Bangers
 Best Specialty Series – MILF: MILF Seeker
 Best Specialty Series – Other Genre: Adorable Girls
 Best Specialty Series – Squirting: Flower's Squirt Shower
 Best Transsexual Series: Transsexual Prostitutes

TECHNICAL AWARDS
 Best Art Direction – Film: Fuck
 Best Art Direction – Video: Sacred Sin
 Best Cinematography: Fuck
 Best DVD Extras: The Visitors
 Best DVD Menus: The Visitors
 Best Editing – Film: Justin Sterling, Johnny 5; Jenna’s Provocateur
 Best Editing – Video: Robin Dyer, Mark Logan; Corruption
 Best Music: Eddie Van Halen, Loren Alexander; Sacred Sin
 Best Screenplay – Film: Brad Armstrong, Manhunters
 Best Screenplay – Video: Alvin Edwards, Eli Cross; Corruption
 Best Videography: Sacred Sin
 Best Special Effects: Kovi, Porn Wars

Honorary AVN Awards

Reuben Sturman Award
 None given this year

Hall of Fame
AVN Hall of Fame inductees for 2007 were: Rebecca Bardoux, Dave Cummings, Taylor Hayes, Rick Masters, John Seeman, Domonique Simone, Selena Steele, Sydnee Steele, Nici Sterling, Tabitha Stevens, Kyle Stone, Vince Vouyer
 Founders Branch: Charlie Brickman, Cinderella Distribution; Phil Harvey, Adam & Eve; Arthur Morowitz and Howard Farber, Video-X-Pix; Sidney Niekirk, Cal Vista

Multiple nominations and awards

The following releases received the most nominations.

The following 14 releases received multiple awards:

Presenters and performers
The following individuals presented awards or performed musical or comedy numbers.

Presenters (in order of appearance)

Performers

Ceremony information

A new venue, the 12,000-seat Mandalay Bay Events Center, was not the only change made at the 2007 AVN Awards show. For the first time, porn fans could purchase tickets to attend the show; previously only industry insiders were permitted to attend.

While the Best DVD award was discontinued, several new awards debuted: Director of the Year (Body of Work), Contract Star of the Year, Underrated Starlet of the Year (Unrecognized Excellence), Best Animated Release, Best Hard-Edged All-Sex Release, Best Interracial Series, Best POV Series and Best POV Sex Scene. Additionally, the Best Specialty Series was split among five categories—Big Bust, MILF, Squirting and Other, along with Best Transsexual Series; Best Ethnic-Themed Series was split into three—Asian, Black and Latin; and Best Online Marketing Campaign was split into Company and Individual Project categories.

Several other people participated in the production of the ceremony. Mark Stone served as musical director for the ceremony and also produced the comedy clips, mostly spoofing TV infomercials and starring Ron Jeremy, Anthony Hardwood, Kurt Lockwood, Lexington Steele and several others. Members of John Stagliano's Fashionistas gave a special performance of the Fashionistas Las Vegas revue.

Wicked Pictures created and distributed a DVD of the year's show.

Performance of year's movies

Pirates was announced as the top selling and top renting movie of the previous year.

In Memoriam
AVN publisher Paul Fishbein's annual In Memoriam tribute honored the following people: Adam & Eve's Mary Gates, VCX co-founder Rudy Sutton and actor Jon Dough.

See also

 AVN Award
 AVN Best New Starlet Award
 AVN Award for Male Performer of the Year
 AVN Award for Male Foreign Performer of the Year
 AVN Female Performer of the Year Award
 List of members of the AVN Hall of Fame
 2007 GayVN Awards

Notes

References

External links

 
 2007 AVN Award nominees (archived at Wayback Machine, November 26, 2006)
 Adult Video News Awards  at the Internet Movie Database
 
 "AVN Awards: gli Oscar del porno" - 2007 AVN Award winners

AVN Awards
2006 film awards